Magdalena Damaske - Dawid (born 19 February 1996) is a Polish volleyball player. She plays for Atom Trefl Sopot in the Orlen Liga.

Damaske was part of the winning Polish team at the 2013 Girls' Youth European Volleyball Championship.

References

Living people
1996 births
Polish women's volleyball players
People from Wejherowo County